Juan Marecos (born 21 August 1969) is a Paraguayan former footballer who played as a defender. He competed in the men's tournament at the 1992 Summer Olympics.

References

1969 births
Living people
Paraguayan footballers
Association football defenders
Paraguay international footballers
Olympic footballers of Paraguay
Footballers at the 1992 Summer Olympics
Club Libertad footballers
Place of birth missing (living people)